Road Tapes, Venue #1 is a double live album by Frank Zappa, released posthumously on October 31, 2012, by the Zappa Family Trust on Vaulternative Records. It was recorded on August 25, 1968 at the Kerrisdale Cyclone Taylor Arena in Vancouver, British Columbia. It is the seventh installment on the Vaulternative Records label that is dedicated to the posthumous release of complete Zappa concerts, following the releases of FZ:OZ (2002), Buffalo (2007), Wazoo (2007), Philly '76 (2009), Hammersmith Odeon (2010) and Carnegie Hall (2011).

Track listing 
All songs written and composed by Frank Zappa except where noted.

Personnel 
 Frank Zappa – guitar, vocals
 Bunk Gardner – woodwinds, voice
 Motorhead Sherwood – baritone sax, tambourine, harmonica
 Don Preston – keyboards
 Ian Underwood – keyboards, woodwinds
 Roy Estrada – bass, vocals
 Jimmy Carl Black – drums, vocals
 Art Tripp III – drums, percussion

References 

Frank Zappa live albums
2012 live albums
Live albums published posthumously